Palawan Press Limited was established in London by Simon Draper in 1992, following his retirement as chairman of the Virgin Music Group after its sale to EMI.

, Palawan Press publishes exclusive limited edition books costing from £75 to £2000.

Publications

Aston Martin

 Aston Martin - The Compleat Car
 The Aston Martin DB3S Sportscar
 Aston Martin Zagato
 Aston Martin Ulster.

Grand Automobile Marques

 Ferrari in Camera
 A Private Car — An account of the Bristol
 The Illustrated Lancia
 Facel Vega - Grand Luxe Sportif
 Gullwing - The Mercedes-Benz 300 SL Coupé
 The Post-War Frazer Nash.
 Bentley Continental Sports Saloon

Motoring, motor racing and motor racing photography

 Racers — Memoirs of the gentleman drivers
 Klemantaski Himself
 Sixties Motor Racing
 1946 and All That
 Dick & George
 Drive On! A Social History of the Motor Car.

Art

 Evermore
 The Atlas of Rare Pheasants Volume I
 The Atlas of Rare Pheasants Volume II

Collectability

A number of editions are considered collectors items. At the Goodwood Revival auction in September 2011, a clothbound edition of Ferrari in Camera sold for £1,063 having originally been available to purchase for £400.

References

"Racers - Memoirs of the Gentleman Drivers". Motorsport magazine. December 2011.
"Racers. The Right Stuff" - Classic Cars magazine. December 2011.
"Racers. Books" - Octane Magazine. December 2011.

External links
 Official web site

Book publishing companies of the United Kingdom